The Model V was among the early electromechanical general purpose computers, designed by George Stibitz and built by Bell Telephone Laboratories, operational in 1946.

Only two machines were built: first one was installed at National Advisory Committee for Aeronautics (NACA, later NASA), the second (1947) at the US Army’s Ballistic Research Laboratory (BRL).

Construction
Design was started in 1944. The tape-controlled (Harvard architecture) machine had two (design allowed for a total of six) processors ("computers") that could operate independently, an early form of multiprocessing.

Significance 
 Inspired Richard Hamming to investigate the automatic error-correction, which led to invention of Hamming codes
 One of the early electromechanical general purpose computers
 First American machine and first George Stibitz design to use floating-point arithmetic
Had an early form of multiprocessing
Had a very primitive form of an operating system, albeit in hardware. A separate hardware control unit existed to direct the sequence of computer operations.

Model VI 
Built and used internally by Bell Telephone Laboratories, operational in 1949.

Simplified version of the Model V (only one processor, about half the relays) but with several improvements, including one of the earliest use of the microcode.

Bibliography

Further reading

References

External links 
 

Bell Labs
1940s computers
AT&T computers
Computer-related introductions in 1946
Electro-mechanical computers